Coleophora enchitis is a moth of the family Coleophoridae. It is found in Kenya.

References

Endemic moths of Kenya
enchitis
Moths described in 1920
Moths of Africa